The following is a list of state highways in the U.S. state of Louisiana designated in the 1100–1149 range.

All are owned and maintained by the Louisiana Department of Transportation and Development (La DOTD) and were designated in the 1955 Louisiana Highway renumbering.  All but three of the routes on this list are proposed for deletion as part of La DOTD's Road Transfer Program.


Louisiana Highway 1100

Louisiana Highway 1100 (LA 1100) runs  in a north–south direction along Higginbotham Highway from LA 98 east of Castille to LA 95 south of Higginhotham.  It is currently proposed for deletion as part of La DOTD's Road Transfer program.

Louisiana Highway 1101

Louisiana Highway 1101 (LA 1101) runs  in a north–south direction from LA 98 in Castille to LA 365 east of Branch.  It is currently proposed for deletion as part of La DOTD's Road Transfer program.

Louisiana Highway 1102

Louisiana Highway 1102 (LA 1102) runs  in an east–west direction along J. E. Pelton Road from LA 35 south of Branch to LA 1101 southeast of Branch.  It is currently proposed for deletion as part of La DOTD's Road Transfer program.

Louisiana Highway 1103

Louisiana Highway 1103 (LA 1103) ran  in a general north–south direction from LA 365 west of Higginbotham to LA 95 north of Higginbotham.  It was transferred to local control in 1961.

Louisiana Highway 1104

Louisiana Highway 1104 (LA 1104) runs  in a northwest to southeast direction along Old Sunset Road from LA 178 in Church Point to LA 754 east of Church Point.  It is currently proposed for deletion as part of La DOTD's Road Transfer program.

Louisiana Highway 1105

Louisiana Highway 1105 (LA 1105) runs  in a general north–south direction from LA 367 southwest of Richard to LA 95 northwest of Church Point.  It is currently proposed for deletion as part of La DOTD's Road Transfer program.

Louisiana Highway 1106

Louisiana Highway 1106 (LA 1106) runs  in an east–west direction along Henry Bieber Road from Gumpoint Road to LA 367 southwest of Richard.  The route's mileposts increase from the eastern end contrary to common practice.  It is currently proposed for deletion as part of La DOTD's Road Transfer program.

Louisiana Highway 1107

Louisiana Highway 1107 (LA 1107) runs  in an east–west direction along Richard School Road from LA 367 west of Richard to the junction of LA 370 and LA 1105 at Richard.  It is currently proposed for deletion as part of La DOTD's Road Transfer program.

Louisiana Highway 1108

Louisiana Highway 1108 (LA 1108) runs  in a north–south direction along Pitreville Highway from LA 95 northwest of Church Point to LA 358 at Pitreville.  It is currently proposed for deletion as part of La DOTD's Road Transfer program.

Louisiana Highway 1109

Louisiana Highway 1109 (LA 1109) runs  in a north–south direction from LA 98 east of Maxie to LA 365 northeast of Maxie.  It is currently proposed for deletion as part of La DOTD's Road Transfer program.

Louisiana Highway 1110

Louisiana Highway 1110 (LA 1110) runs  in a southwest to northeast direction along Providence Highway from LA 98 east of Maxie to LA 367 at Link.  It is currently proposed for deletion as part of La DOTD's Road Transfer program.

Louisiana Highway 1111

Louisiana Highway 1111 (LA 1111) runs  in a southwest to northeast direction from LA 13 in Crowley to LA 98 west of Roberts Cove.  The route has a spur that consists of two road sections forming a Y-intersection with US 90.  The majority of mainline LA 1111 is currently proposed for deletion as part of La DOTD's Road Transfer program.  A transfer agreement is pending for the east–west portion parallel to I-10.

Louisiana Highway 1112

Louisiana Highway 1112 (LA 1112) ran  along Bayou Plaquemine Road in a loop off of LA 1111 north of Crowley.  It was transferred to local control as part of the La DOTD Road Transfer program in 2018.

Louisiana Highway 1113

Louisiana Highway 1113 (LA 1113) runs  in a north–south direction from LA 98 at Roberts Cove to LA 367 northeast of Roberts Cove.  The route has a spur that travels  along Wabash Road from LA 1113 to LA 98 northwest of Roberts Cove.  Both LA 1113 and its spur are currently proposed for deletion as part of La DOTD's Road Transfer program.

Louisiana Highway 1114

Louisiana Highway 1114 (LA 1114) ran  in an east–west direction from a local road to LA 13 south of Lyons Point.  It was transferred to local control by 1958.

Louisiana Highway 1115

Louisiana Highway 1115 (LA 1115) runs  in an east–west direction along Lyons Point Highway from LA 91 south of Morse to LA 13 east of Lyons Point.  It is currently proposed for deletion as part of La DOTD's Road Transfer program.

Louisiana Highway 1116

Louisiana Highway 1116 (LA 1116) ran  in a north–south direction from a local road southwest of Crowley to US 90 west of Crowley.  It was transferred to local control by 1958.

Louisiana Highway 1117

Louisiana Highway 1117 (LA 1117) ran  in an east–west direction along Old Spanish Trail from LA 92 east of Mermentau to US 90 in Estherwood.  It was transferred to local control in 1963.

Louisiana Highway 1118

Louisiana Highway 1118 (LA 1118) ran  in a north–south direction from a local road to LA 1117 west of Midland.  It was transferred to local control in 1963.

Louisiana Highway 1119

Louisiana Highway 1119 (LA 1119) runs  in a north–south direction along Vincent Road from Legros Road to LA 92 south of Mermentau.  The route's mileposts increase from the northern end contrary to common practice.

LA 1119 begins at a T-intersection with Legros Road, a local road. At this junction, LA 92 turns east from Mermentau Cove Road onto West Whitney Street. LA 1119 is an undivided two-lane highway for its entire length.

In the pre-1955 state highway system, LA 1119 was designated as State Route C-1566.  LA 1119 was created in the 1955 Louisiana Highway renumbering, and its route has remained the same to the present day.  It is currently proposed for deletion as part of La DOTD's Road Transfer program.

Louisiana Highway 1120

Louisiana Highway 1120 (LA 1120) runs  in a north–south direction from the junction of LA 91 and LA 100 east of Egan to LA 98 east of Iota.  The route's mileposts increase from the northern end contrary to common practice.  It is currently proposed for deletion as part of La DOTD's Road Transfer program.

Louisiana Highway 1121

Louisiana Highway 1121 (LA 1121) runs  in a north–south direction from LA 100 at Lawson to LA 13 north of Crowley.

The route begins on LA 100, which closely follows the north side of I-10 between Crowley and Egan. LA 1121 is an undivided two-lane highway for its entire length.

In the pre-1955 state highway system, LA 1121 was designated as State Route 26-D.  LA 1121 was created in the 1955 Louisiana Highway renumbering, and its route has remained the same to the present day.  The main purpose was served for a quicker route for LA-100 users to merge onto North LA-13, but it is now currently proposed for deletion as part of La DOTD's Road Transfer program.

Louisiana Highway 1122

Louisiana Highway 1122 (LA 1122) ran  in an east–west direction from LA 91 south of Iota to LA 13 at Ellis.  It was transferred to local control in 1961.

Louisiana Highway 1123

Louisiana Highway 1123 (LA 1123) runs  in a general north–south direction from the junction of LA 97 and LA 98 west of Iota to a second junction with LA 97 northwest of Iota.  It is currently proposed for deletion as part of La DOTD's Road Transfer program.

Louisiana Highway 1124

Louisiana Highway 1124 (LA 1124) runs  in a north–south direction along South Leblanc Street from LA 92 east of Morse to US 90 in Estherwood.  It is currently proposed for deletion as part of La DOTD's Road Transfer program.

Louisiana Highway 1125

Louisiana Highway 1125 (LA 1125) ran  in an east–west direction from a local road to a junction with LA 99 south of Welsh.  It was transferred to local control in 1963.

Louisiana Highway 1126

Louisiana Highway 1126 (LA 1126) runs  in an east–west direction from LA 99 south of Welsh to US 90 southeast of Jennings.  The portion east of LA 26 is currently proposed for deletion as part of La DOTD's Road Transfer program.

The route primarily follows a rural section line road south of and parallel to US 90.  It has a brief concurrency with LA 26, which connects with Jennings to the north and Lake Arthur to the south.  LA 1126 is an undivided two-lane highway for its entire length.

Louisiana Highway 1127

Louisiana Highway 1127 (LA 1127) ran  in a north–south direction from a local road southeast of Roanoke to LA 395 north of Roanoke.  It was transferred to local control in 1963.

Louisiana Highway 1128

Louisiana Highway 1128 (LA 1128) ran  in a general north–south direction from LA 102 east of Hathaway to a local road at Panchoville.  It was transferred to local control in 1973.

Louisiana Highway 1129

Louisiana Highway 1129 (LA 1129) runs  in a north–south direction along Lee Road from LA 40 to Louisiana Tung Road north of Covington.  It is currently proposed for deletion as part of La DOTD's Road Transfer program.

Louisiana Highway 1130

Louisiana Highway 1130 (LA 1130) runs  in an east–west direction from US 190 in Elton to LA 26 east of Elton.  It is currently proposed for deletion as part of La DOTD's Road Transfer program.

Louisiana Highway 1131

Louisiana Highway 1131 (LA 1131) runs  in a north–south direction from a local road southwest of Welsh to a junction with US 90 west of Welsh.  The route's mileposts increase from the northern end contrary to common practice.  It is currently proposed for deletion as part of La DOTD's Road Transfer program.

Louisiana Highway 1132

Louisiana Highway 1132 (LA 1132) ran  in an east–west direction from LA 26 to a local road south of Jennings.  It was transferred to local control in 1961.

Louisiana Highway 1133

Louisiana Highway 1133 (LA 1133) runs  in a general north–south direction from the junction of LA 27 and LA 108 to a second junction with LA 108 in Carlyss.  It is currently proposed for deletion as part of La DOTD's Road Transfer program.

Louisiana Highway 1134

Louisiana Highway 1134 (LA 1134) ran  in a north–south direction from LA 108 south of Hollywood to US 90 in Maplewood.  It was transferred to local control in 1962.

Louisiana Highway 1135

Louisiana Highway 1135 (LA 1135) ran  in a southwest to northeast direction in a loop off of LA 384 south of Lake Charles.  It was transferred to local control in 1962.

Louisiana Highway 1136

Louisiana Highway 1136 (LA 1136) ran  in a northwest to southeast direction from LA 385 at Prairieland to LA 397 southwest of Holmwood.  It was transferred to local control in 1963.

Louisiana Highway 1137

Louisiana Highway 1137 (LA 1137) ran  in a north–south direction from LA 473 north of Toro to a local road at Rattan.  It was transferred to local control by 1958, but the southern portion later became part of LA 191.

Louisiana Highway 1138

Louisiana Highway 1138 (LA 1138) consists of three road segments with a total length of  that are located in the Calcasieu Parish city of Lake Charles.  Approximately half the mileage is currently proposed for deletion as part of La DOTD's Road Transfer program.

LA 1138-1 runs  along Nelson Road from LA 1138-2 to a point just beyond the entrance to L'Auberge Casino Resort.
LA 1138-2 runs  along Nelson Road from LA 384 north to LA 1138-1, then east along West Prien Lake Road to LA 385.
LA 1138-3 runs  along Legion Street from LA 14 (Gerstner Memorial Drive) to I-210.

Routes deleted since the 1955 Louisiana Highway renumbering include:
LA 1138-1 formerly ran  along Harrison Street from the I-10/US 90 frontage road south of Westlake to LA 379 in Westlake.  It was transferred to local control in 1964, and its designation was given to the current route in 2009.
LA 1138-4 ran  along Moeling Street from North Prater Street to US 171 in Lake Charles.  It was transferred to local control in 1975.
LA 1138-5 ran  along North Simmons, Medora, and Graham Streets from LA 1138-4 (Moeling Street) to US 171 in Lake Charles.  It was transferred to local control in 1975.

Louisiana Highway 1139

Louisiana Highway 1139 (LA 1139) ran  in a north–south direction from LA 27 west of Iowa to a local road northwest of Iowa.  It was transferred to local control by 1958.

Louisiana Highway 1140

Louisiana Highway 1140 (LA 1140) ran  in a north–south direction from LA 82 to a local road in Johnsons Bayou.  It was transferred to local control by 1958.

Louisiana Highway 1141

Louisiana Highway 1141 (LA 1141) runs  in a north–south direction from a dead end at the Calcasieu Ship Channel to a junction with the concurrent LA 27 and LA 82 in Cameron.  It is currently proposed for deletion as part of La DOTD's Road Transfer program.

Across the pass, the roadway resumes and proceeds a short distance to a junction with LA 27/LA 82 (Marshall Street) in Cameron, the unincorporated seat of Cameron Parish. LA 1141 is an undivided two-lane highway for its entire length.

Once part of the main highway running along the Gulf of Mexico through Cameron Parish, this section of roadway was severed from the mainland in the mid-1940s when the Calcasieu Ship Channel was dug across its right-of-way.  This bypassed a sharp bend in Calcasieu Pass and created what became known as Monkey Island.  A second ferry crossing was necessary to carry automobile traffic through Cameron until the highway was re-aligned to the north of the island around 1954.  The additional ferry remained in service on the original alignment, designated as LA 1141 in the 1955 Louisiana Highway renumbering, maintaining the connection between the island and LA 27/LA 82 on the mainland.  By the mid-1990s, the Monkey Island Ferry had become a source of controversy, and state legislators complained about this expenditure of public funds which benefited only the seven families then living on the island.  Discontinuation of the service had been threatened for several years when, in 2005, Hurricane Rita destroyed all structures on Monkey Island, displacing its residents and forcing the ferry's abandonment.  As of 2017, LA 1141 remains in the state highway system though the roadway is heavily damaged and mostly inaccessible.

Louisiana Highway 1142

Louisiana Highway 1142 (LA 1142) runs  in a north–south direction along Beach Road from the intersection of Gayle Street and Broussard Beach Road to the concurrent LA 27 and LA 82 in Cameron.  It is currently proposed for deletion as part of La DOTD's Road Transfer program.

Louisiana Highway 1143

Louisiana Highway 1143 (LA 1143) runs  in an east–west direction from the junction of LA 27 and LA 82 at Creole to a local road east of Creole.  It is currently proposed for deletion as part of La DOTD's Road Transfer program.

Louisiana Highway 1144

Louisiana Highway 1144 (LA 1144) runs  in a northwest to southeast direction along Big Pasture Road from LA 384 to a dead end southeast of Grand Lake.  It is currently proposed for deletion as part of La DOTD's Road Transfer program.

Louisiana Highway 1145

Louisiana Highway 1145 (LA 1145) runs  in a north–south direction from LA 76 west of Port Allen to the concurrent US 190 and LA 1 at Westover.

The route heads due north from LA 76 (Rosedale Road) along Calumet Road, traveling through rural farmland.  After , LA 1145 curves slightly northeast and maintains this heading for the remainder of its length.  Immediately after crossing the Union Pacific Railroad (UP) line at grade, the highway reaches its northern terminus at US 190/LA 1 (Airline Highway), connecting with Baton Rouge to the east and Opelousas to the west.  LA 1145 is an undivided two-lane highway for its entire length.

In the pre-1955 state highway system LA 1145 was designated as State Route C-1409.  LA 1145 was created in the 1955 Louisiana Highway renumbering, and its route has remained the same to its present day.  It is currently proposed for deletion as part of La DOTD's Road Transfer program.

Louisiana Highway 1146

Louisiana Highway 1146 (LA 1146) runs  in a southeast to northwest direction from LA 112 east of DeRidder to US 171 in Rosepine.  It is currently proposed for deletion as part of La DOTD's Road Transfer program.

Louisiana Highway 1147

Louisiana Highway 1147 (LA 1147) runs  in a southeast to northwest direction from LA 113 at Bundick to LA 26 east of DeRidder.  It is currently proposed for deletion as part of La DOTD's Road Transfer program.

Louisiana Highway 1148

Louisiana Highway 1148 (LA 1148) runs  in an east–west direction from a local road southwest of Addis to LA 988 north of Plaquemine.  The route's mileposts increase from the eastern end contrary to common practice.  It is currently proposed for deletion as part of La DOTD's Road Transfer program.  LA 1148 has a truck route that runs  along Industrial Boulevard, a local road, on the western side of LA 1.

Louisiana Highway 1149

Louisiana Highway 1149 (LA 1149) ran  in a southwest to northeast direction from a local road at the Jefferson Davis–Allen in Indian Village to US 165 in Kinder.  It became part of LA 383 in 1963.

See also

References

Footnotes

Works cited

External links
Maps / GIS Data Homepage, Louisiana Department of Transportation and Development